Christopher Keith "Chris" Brady (born March 3, 2004) is an American professional soccer player who plays as a goalkeeper for Major League Soccer club Chicago Fire.

Club career
Born in Naperville, Illinois, Brady joined the Chicago Fire in 2017, playing with the youth academy. On March 24, 2020, Brady signed a homegrown player deal with the Fire, joining the club's first team in Major League Soccer.

Loan to Forward Madison 
On July 24, 2020, Brady was loaned to USL League One club Forward Madison. He made his professional debut for the club on August 23 against Orlando City B, starting in a 3–1 victory.

On November 13, 2020, following the 2020 season, Brady was named as the USL League One Young Player of the Year. In eight matches, Brady recorded three cleansheets throughout his loan.

The next season, Brady returned to Forward Madison on June 11, 2021, on loan. Similar to the previous season, Brady would split his training with both Forward Madison while returning to the Chicago Fire occasionally. A day later, on June 12, Brady made his return debut for the club against the Richmond Kickers. He earned the cleansheet in the 0–0 draw, including saving a one-on-one opportunity against the Kickers' Emiliano Terzaghi.

International career
On January 25, 2019, Brady was selected into the United States under-15 side that would participate in the CONCACAF Boys' Under-15 Championship. Brady led  United States men's national under-20 soccer team to a 2022 CONCACAF U-20 Championship title and won the Golden Glove award, awarded to the tournaments best goalkeeper.

Career statistics

Honors
United States U20
CONCACAF U-20 Championship: 2022

Individual
USL League One Young Player of the Year: 2020
CONCACAF U-20 Championship Best XI: 2022
CONCACAF U-20 Championship Golden Glove: 2022

References

External links
 Profile at Chicago Fire

2004 births
Living people
Sportspeople from Naperville, Illinois
American soccer players
Association football goalkeepers
Homegrown Players (MLS)
Chicago Fire FC players
Forward Madison FC players
USL League One players
Soccer players from Illinois
United States men's youth international soccer players
MLS Next Pro players
Chicago Fire FC II players